Trefor is a hamlet in the community of Bodffordd, Anglesey, Wales, which is 136 miles (218.9 km) from Cardiff and 219.6 miles (353.4 km) from London.

References

See also 
 List of localities in Wales by population

Villages in Anglesey
Hamlets in Wales